Capital League 1 is the second tier of men's senior football (soccer) in Brisbane, (5th tier Queensland and Level 6 within Australia). It is administered by Football Brisbane. All clubs participating in Capital League 1 must field two teams, one in first grade, and another in the reserves competition. Clubs in the NPL and Brisbane Premier League cannot field their reserves teams in this division.

History
The first edition of a second tier league in the Brisbane soccer competition to be widely reported was the newly formed Division 2 in 1921. Seven clubs contested the Division 2 championship in 1921: Blackstone Rovers, Queens Park, Kangaroo Rats, Western Suburbs, Toowong, Bulimba Rangers and Kedron United. Blackstone Rovers, an Ipswich-based club, won the Division 2 premiership after beating Queens Park 1–0 in a play-off after the clubs finished level on points at the end of the regular season.

A second division of the Brisbane soccer competition has been contested continuously since 1921 with the exception of the early 1930s when the Ipswich clubs broke away from the Brisbane competition to form their own league, and during World War 2. When the top clubs split away to form the Queensland Soccer Federation in 1962, enough clubs joined the new body to form a Division One under the new State League. The QSF absorbed the former Brisbane & Ipswich District Football Association clubs in 1964 and the top two divisions were renamed back to Division One and Two in 1965. Since the formation of the Brisbane Premier League in 1983, the Brisbane soccer competition structure has been altered several times. Second tier divisions in the Brisbane competition have been:
Division 2 (1921 to 1961)
QSF Division 1 (1962 to 1964)
Division 2 (1965 to 1982)
Division 1 (1983)
Intermediate League (1984 to 1986)
Division 2 (1987 to 1996)
Semi-Pro Division (1997 to 2001) – in North and South sections from 1997 to 2000
Division 1 (2002)
Premier Division 1 (2003 to 2012)
Capital League 1 (2013 to present).

From 2003 to 2012 the tier below the Brisbane Premier League was known as Premier Division 1. It operated as a twelve team competition from 2004 to 2009, then expanded to fourteen teams for season 2010, to accommodate clubs returning to the BPL from the now defunct Queensland State League.

Since being renamed Capital League 1 in 2013 in which the competition has returned to a 12 team format.

Format
The regular season consists of 22 rounds with teams playing each other twice in a home and away format. The team which finishes first is crowned as the Premiers of the division.

Following the regular season the top four teams on the table play in a finals series using the following format:
 First Week: Semi Final 1 – 3rd vs 4th; Semi Final 2 – 1st vs 2nd
 Second Week: Preliminary Final – Loser Semi 2 vs Winner Semi 1
 Final Week: Grand Final – Winner Semi 2 vs Winner Preliminary.
The winner of the Grand Final is declared as the Champions of the division.

Promotion/relegation
At the end of the regular season the top two teams are eligible for promotion to Brisbane Premier League.The bottom two teams at the end of the regular season are relegated to Capital League 2.

Clubs

The clubs for the 2022 season are shown in the table below:

Seasons since 1962

 Sources:www.socceraust.co.uk
Brisbane Football (Soccer) Tables (Tier 2 Top Four – 1921 to 2018)

Media

Matches from Capital League 1 are irregularly filmed by FBTV. Media outlets in Ipswich and Toowoomba in particular follow the fortunes of their local clubs.

References

External links
 Football Brisbane Official Website
 Football Queensland Official website
 SportsTG Fixtures & Results

Football Queensland
Soccer leagues in Queensland
Sports leagues established in 2013
2013 establishments in Australia
Sixth level football leagues in Asia